Paul Hudson (born 20 July 1970) is a former Australian rules footballer who played for Hawthorn, the Western Bulldogs and Richmond in the Australian Football League (AFL). He currently serves as a development coach with St Kilda and as the senior coach of Victorian Football League club Sandringham.

Playing career
In 1990, Hudson followed in his father Peter's footsteps and joined Hawthorn, for which he would play until the end of the 1996 season. A half forward, in his seven seasons at the club, he kicked 264 goals, averaging nearly 38 goals a year. In 1991, just his second year of AFL football, he finished fifth in the Brownlow Medal and kicked a couple of goals in their grand final victory. In the 1992 pre-season competition, he won the first ever Michael Tuck Medal for his performance in the grand final. He was traded to the Western Bulldogs for the 1997 season and he earned All-Australian selection in 1998. He was on-traded to Richmond at the end of 2001 and only managed three games before retiring in 2002.

Statistics

|-
|- style="background-color: #EAEAEA"
| scope="row" | 1990 ||  || 33
| 7 || 1 || 6 || 51 || 33 || 84 || 24 || 3 || 0.1 || 0.9 || 7.3 || 4.7 || 12.0 || 3.4 || 0.4 || 2
|-
| scope="row" bgcolor=F0E68C | 1991# ||  || 33
| 25 || 62 || 49 || 343 || 184 || 527 || 137 || 34 || 2.5 || 2.0 || 13.7 || 7.4 || 21.1 || 5.5 || 1.4 || 17
|- style="background-color: #EAEAEA"
| scope="row" | 1992 ||  || 17
| 20 || 39 || 39 || 194 || 92 || 286 || 86 || 24 || 2.0 || 2.0 || 9.7 || 4.6 || 14.3 || 4.3 || 1.2 || 2
|-
| scope="row" | 1993 ||  || 17
| 21 || 51 || 39 || 240 || 79 || 319 || 110 || 22 || 2.4 || 1.9 || 11.4 || 3.8 || 15.2 || 5.2 || 1.0 || 3
|- style="background-color: #EAEAEA"
| scope="row" | 1994 ||  || 17
| 23 || 47 || 36 || 213 || 86 || 299 || 101 || 30 || 2.0 || 1.6 || 9.3 || 3.7 || 13.0 || 4.4 || 1.3 || 1
|-
| scope="row" | 1995 ||  || 17
| 21 || 42 || 34 || 185 || 69 || 254 || 79 || 14 || 2.0 || 1.6 || 8.8 || 3.3 || 12.1 || 3.8 || 0.7 || 0
|- style="background-color: #EAEAEA"
| scope="row" | 1996 ||  || 17
| 17 || 22 || 26 || 113 || 47 || 160 || 52 || 15 || 1.3 || 1.5 || 6.6 || 2.8 || 9.4 || 3.1 || 0.9 || 0
|-
| scope="row" | 1997 ||  || 9
| 20 || 27 || 25 || 154 || 78 || 232 || 75 || 15 || 1.4 || 1.3 || 7.7 || 3.9 || 11.6 || 3.8 || 0.8 || 0
|- style="background-color: #EAEAEA"
| scope="row" | 1998 ||  || 9
| 23 || 61 || 27 || 226 || 105 || 331 || 101 || 32 || 2.7 || 1.2 || 9.8 || 4.6 || 14.4 || 4.4 || 1.4 || 0
|-
| scope="row" | 1999 ||  || 9
| 22 || 51 || 26 || 169 || 72 || 241 || 90 || 23 || 2.3 || 1.2 || 7.7 || 3.3 || 11.0 || 4.1 || 1.0 || 1
|- style="background-color: #EAEAEA"
| scope="row" | 2000 ||  || 9
| 21 || 37 || 26 || 160 || 71 || 231 || 91 || 20 || 1.8 || 1.2 || 7.6 || 3.4 || 11.0 || 4.3 || 1.0 || 0
|-
| scope="row" | 2001 ||  || 9
| 22 || 38 || 29 || 128 || 65 || 193 || 80 || 15 || 1.7 || 1.3 || 5.8 || 3.0 || 8.8 || 3.6 || 0.7 || 3
|- style="background-color: #EAEAEA"
| scope="row" | 2002 ||  || 17
| 3 || 1 || 2 || 12 || 6 || 18 || 8 || 3 || 0.3 || 0.7 || 4.0 || 2.0 || 6.0 || 2.7 || 1.0 || 0
|- class="sortbottom"
! colspan=3| Career !! 245 !! 479 !! 364 !! 2188 !! 987 !! 3175 !! 1034 !! 250 !! 2.0 !! 1.5 !! 8.9 !! 4.0 !! 13.0 !! 4.2 !! 1.0 !! 29
|}

Honours and achievements
Team
 AFL premiership player: 1991

Individual
 All-Australian team: 1998
 Western Bulldogs leading goalkicker: 1998, 1999

Coaching career
Hudson worked as an assistant coach with both the Brisbane Lions and Collingwood. He is currently the development manager for the St Kilda Football Club through the Saints' association with Sandringham as its VFL senior coach. His father Peter had been the football manager at St Kilda under the Ken Sheldon coaching reign from 1990 until 1993.

References

External links

1970 births
Living people
Australian rules footballers from Tasmania
Western Bulldogs players
Hawthorn Football Club players
Hawthorn Football Club Premiership players
Richmond Football Club players
Hobart Football Club players
All-Australians (AFL)
Tasmanian State of Origin players
Tasmanian Football Hall of Fame inductees
Allies State of Origin players
One-time VFL/AFL Premiership players